Beleli Railway Station (Balochi:بیلیلی ریلوے اسٹیشن) is located in Beleli town, Quetta district of Balochistan province of the Pakistan.

See also
 List of railway stations in Pakistan
 Pakistan Railways

References

Railway stations in Quetta District
Railway stations on Rohri–Chaman Railway Line